Elections of police and crime commissioners in England and Wales were held on 5 May 2016.

The elections were for 40 of the 43 territorial police forces in England and Wales using the supplementary vote system; the two police forces of Greater London are not involved (the elected Mayor of London is classed as the police and crime commissioner for the Metropolitan Police District, while the Court of Common Council fulfils the role for the City of London Police). There was no election for the Greater Manchester Police as the role of police and crime commissioner was due to be abolished in 2017 and replaced with the directly elected Mayor of Greater Manchester. Elections for police and crime commissioners do not take place in Scotland or Northern Ireland as policing and justice powers are devolved to the Scottish Parliament and Northern Ireland Assembly.

This was the second time police and crime commissioner elections had been held.

Background
The election used the supplementary vote system: voters were instructed to mark the ballot paper with their first and second choices of candidate (although there were an unusually large number of spoilt ballots). If no candidate got a majority of first preference votes, the top two candidates went on to a second round in which second preference votes of the eliminated candidates were allocated to them to produce a winner. This is the system used to elect London's mayor. Section 57 of the Police Reform and Social Responsibility Act 2011 directs that the voting system is first past the post if there are only two candidates for a specific commissioner region.

The role of police and crime commissioner for the Greater Manchester Police was abolished in 2017 and replaced with the directly elected Mayor of Greater Manchester, who assumed the responsibilities of the police and crime commissioner. No election was therefore held in 2016 and Tony Lloyd remained as police and crime commissioner and interim mayor until the mayoral election took place in 2017.

Parties standing
Both Labour and the Conservatives fielded candidates in all 40 elections, while UKIP fielded 34 candidates and the Liberal Democrats 30 candidates. The Green Party fielded seven candidates and the English Democrats four candidates. Plaid Cymru fielded candidates for all four Welsh seats. There were 29 other candidates; 25 stood as independents and four stood under other labels (one as Lincolnshire Independents and three as Zero Tolerance Policing ex Chief).

Results summary

Vote and seat changes are calculated with reference to the 2012 election, excluding Greater Manchester which was not up for election in 2016, due to being replaced by a Metro Mayor.

England

Avon and Somerset Constabulary
Sue Mountstevens (Independent), incumbent, sought re-election.

Kerry Barker (Labour), criminal law barrister.
Chris Briton (Green), former Mayor of Wells City Council and probation officer.
Paul Crossley (Liberal Democrat), Bath & North East Somerset Councillor and former Council leader.
Aaron Foot (UKIP), a farm owner.
Kevin Phillips (Independent), former Chairman of Avon and Somerset Police Federation
Mark Weston (Conservative), leader of the Conservative group on Bristol City Council.

Bedfordshire Constabulary
Olly Martins (Labour), incumbent, sought re-election.

 Toni Bugle (English Democrats)
 Kathryn Holloway (Conservative), former television presenter.
 Duncan Strachan (UKIP)
 Linda Jack (Liberal Democrat),

Cambridgeshire Constabulary
Sir Graham Bright (Conservative), incumbent, did not seek re-election.
Jason Ablewhite (Conservative), leader of Huntingdonshire District Council.
Dave Baigent (Labour), former firefighter.
Rupert Moss-Eccardt (Liberal Democrat)
Nick Clarke (UKIP), former leader of Cambridgeshire County Council.

Cheshire Constabulary
John Dwyer (Conservative), incumbent, sought re-election.

David Keane (Labour), member of Warrington Borough Council.
 Neil Lewis (Liberal Democrats), local entrepreneur and former member of the Economist Group.
 Jonathan Charles Starkey (UKIP), composer and pianist.

Cleveland Police
Barry Coppinger (Labour), incumbent, sought re-election.

Sultan Alam (independent)
Steve Matthews (UKIP)
Matthew Vickers (Conservative), member of Stockton-on-Tees Borough Council.

Cumbria Constabulary

Richard Rhodes (Conservative), incumbent, did not seek re-election. Candidates include:
 Loraine Birchall (Liberal Democrat), a web and management consultant
 Peter McCall (Conservative), a former colonel in the British Army.
 Mary Robinson (Independent), member of Cumbria County Council
 Reg Watson (Labour), member of Cumbria County Council
 Michael Pye (UKIP)

Derbyshire Constabulary
Alan Charles, (Labour), incumbent, did not seek re-election.
Richard Bright (Conservative), member of Derbyshire Dales District Council.
Hardyal Dhindsa (Labour), member of Derby City Council.
Stuart Yeowart (UKIP), former police officer.

Devon and Cornwall Police
Tony Hogg (Conservative), incumbent, did not seek re-election.
Alison Hernandez (Conservative), former member of Torbay Council.
Gareth Derrick (Labour), a former Commodore in the Royal Navy.
Richard Younger-Ross (Liberal Democrat), former MP for Teignbridge.
Jonathan Smith (UKIP), former police officer.
William Morris (independent)
Bob Spencer (independent)

Dorset Police
Martyn Underhill (Independent), incumbent, sought re-election.

Patrick Canavan (Labour), former trade union regional officer.
Andrew Graham (Conservative), a former lieutenant general in the British Army.
Lester Taylor (UKIP).

Durham Constabulary
Ron Hogg (Labour), incumbent, sought re-election.

Peter Cuthbertson (Conservative), lawyer.
Craig Martin (Liberal Democrat), teacher.

Essex Constabulary
Nick Alston (Conservative), incumbent, did not seek re-election.

Roger Hirst (Conservative), deputy leader of Brentwood Borough Council.
Kevin McNamara (Liberal Democrat)
Bob Spink (UKIP), former MP for Castle Point.
Martin Terry (Zero Tolerance Policing ex Chief)
Chris Vince (Labour)

Gloucestershire Constabulary
Martin Surl (Independent), incumbent, sought re-election
Barry Kirby (Labour), Gloucestershire County Councillor.
Will Windsor-Clive (Conservative), Gloucestershire County Councillor.

Hampshire Constabulary
Simon Hayes (independent), incumbent, sought re-election

Richard Adair (Liberal Democrats)
Don Jerrard (independent)
Michael Lane (Conservative)
Robin Price (Labour)
Roy Swales (UKIP), former police officer and former soldier
Steve Watts (Zero Tolerance Policing ex Chief)

Hertfordshire Constabulary
David Lloyd (Conservative), incumbent, sought re-election

Mark Hughes (UKIP)
Kerry Pollard (Labour), former MP for St Albans
Chris White (Liberal Democrats)

Humberside Police
Matthew Grove (Conservative), incumbent, sought re-election

Denis Healy (Liberal Democrats)
Keith Hunter (Labour)
Michael Whitehead (UKIP)

Kent Police
Ann Barnes (Independent), incumbent, did not seek re-election.

Henry Bolton (UKIP)
Tim Garbutt (Independent)
Dave Naghi (Liberal Democrats)
Tristan Osborne (Labour)
Matthew Scott (Conservative)
Steve Uncles (English Democrats), previously stood in 2012

Lancashire Constabulary
Clive Grunshaw was the incumbent Labour Party PCC.
 James Barker (UKIP)
 Andy Pratt (Conservative)
 Graham Roach (Liberal Democrats).

Leicestershire Police
Air Chief Marshal Sir Clive Loader (Conservative), incumbent, did not seek re-election.
Willy Bach, Baron Bach (Labour)
Neil Bannister (Conservative)
Sarah Hill (Liberal Democrat)
David Sprason (UKIP)

Lincolnshire Police
Alan Hardwick (Independent), incumbent, did not seek re-election.
Victoria Ayling (UKIP), member of Lincolnshire County Council.
Marc Jones (Conservative), member of Lincolnshire County Council.
Lucinda Preston (Labour)
Daniel Simpson (Lincolnshire Independent)

Merseyside Police
Jane Kennedy was the incumbent Labour Party PCC.
 Christopher Carubia (Liberal Democrats).
 David Robert Burgess-Joyce (Conservative)
 John Bernard Coyne (Green)

Norfolk Constabulary
Stephen Bett (Independent), incumbent, sought re-election,

Lorne Green (Conservative)
Martin Schmierer (Green), member of Norwich City Council
Jacky Howe (Liberal Democrat)
Chris Jones (Labour)
David Moreland (UKIP)

Northamptonshire Constabulary
Sam Watts (UKIP)
Stephen Mold (Conservative)
Kevin McKeever (Labour)

Northumbria Police

Vera Baird, incumbent (Labour)
Stewart Hay (Conservative) - former DCI with the Force and Whitley Bay solicitor
Melanie Hurst (UKIP)
Jonathan Wallace (Liberal Democrat)

North Yorkshire Police

James Blanchard (Liberal Democrat)
Steve Howley (Labour)
Julia Mulligan (Conservative)
Mike Pannett (independent)

Nottinghamshire Constabulary
Paddy Tipping (Labour), incumbent and former MP
Anthony Harper (Conservative)
Tony Bates (independent)
Jason Zadrozny (independent)
Fran Loi (UKIP)

South Yorkshire Police
David Allen (English Democrats)
Alan Billings (Labour), incumbent, sought re-election
Gavin Felton (UKIP)
Joe Otten (Liberal Democrat)
Ian Walker (Conservative)

Staffordshire Police
George Adamson (Labour)
Natalie Devaney (Independent)
Matthew Ellis, incumbent (Conservative)
Harold Gregory (UKIP)
Paul Woodhead (Green Party)

Suffolk Constabulary
Terence Carter (Green Party)
Helen Korfanty (Liberal Democrats)
Tim Passmore, incumbent (Conservative)
Cath Pickles (Labour)
Simon Tobin (UKIP)

Surrey Police

Sussex Police
Katy Bourne (Conservative), incumbent, stood for re-election
James Doyle (Green Party)
Michael Jones (Labour)
Patrick Lowe (UKIP)
James Walsh (Liberal Democrat)

Thames Valley Police
Laetisia Carter (Labour)
John Howson (Liberal Democrats)
Anthony Stansfeld (Conservative)
Lea Trainer (UKIP)

Warwickshire Police
Nicola Davies (Liberal Democrats)
Rob Harris (UKIP)
Julie Jackson (Labour)
Philip Seccombe (Conservative)
Ben Twomey (Independent)
Dave Whitehouse (Independent)

West Mercia Police
John-Paul Campion (Conservative)
Peter Jewell (UKIP)
John Raine (Green Party)
Margaret Rowley (Liberal Democrats)
Barrie Sheldon (independent)
Daniel Walton (Labour)

Conservative candidate John-Paul Campion won in the final round with 60.25% of the vote against Labour's Daniel Walton with 39.75%. This was a Conservative gain, as the incumbent Bill Longmore, who chose not to contest the election, had previously been elected as an independent.

West Midlands Police
David Jamieson (Labour), incumbent, stood for re-election
Pete Durnell (UKIP)
Andy Flynn (independent)
Les Jones (Conservative)
Labour's David Jamieson was re-elected in the final round with 63.3% of the vote against 36.7% for Conservative candidate Les Jones. This was a Labour hold, with the party winning both the initial contest for the post in 2012 and the by-election in 2014 won by Jamieson.

West Yorkshire Police
Mark Burns-Williamson (Labour), incumbent, stood for re-election
Peter Corkindale (UKIP)
Allan Doherty (Conservative)
Stewart Golton (Liberal Democrats)
Therese Muchewicz (English Democrats)

Wiltshire Police
Angus Macpherson (Conservative), incumbent, sought re-election
Brian Mathew (Liberal Democrats)
John Short (UKIP)
Kevin Small (Labour)

Wales

Dyfed-Powys Police
Christopher Salmon (Conservative), incumbent, sought re-election.

Richard Church (Liberal Democrat), former member of Northamptonshire County Council.
William Davies (independent)
Dafydd Llywelyn (Plaid Cymru), university lecturer.
Kevin Madge (Labour)
Des Parkinson (UKIP), a former police chief superintendent.

Gwent Police
Ian Johnston (Independent), incumbent, did not seek re-election.
Darren Jones (Plaid Cymru), former councillor and council cabinet member
Louise Brown (Conservative)
Jeff Cuthbert (Labour), Welsh Assembly Member for Caerphilly

North Wales Police
Arfon Jones (Plaid Cymru)
David Taylor (Labour)
Simon Wall (UKIP)
Matt Wright (Conservatives)

South Wales Police
Mike Baker (Independent) who had contested the seat in 2012
Timothy Davies (Conservative)
Alun Michael (Labour), incumbent, is seeking re-election
Linet Purcell (Plaid Cymru)
Judith Woodman (Liberal Democrat)

Changes between 2016 and 2020

Northumbria Police by-election 2019
Caused by the resignation of incumbent Vera Baird (Labour)

Notes

References

External links
 Choose my PCC – official site listing the candidates in each area

Police and crime commissioner
2016
Police and crime commissioner elections
Police and crime commissioner elections
England and Wales police and crime commissioner elections
Police and crime commissioner elections
Police and crime commissioner elections